Vera Ada Summers  (born 1899) was an Australian high school teacher and principal.

Biography 
Summers attended Perth College followed by the University of Western Australia, where she completed a bachelor of arts degree. She was a member of the staff of Presbyterian Ladies' College, Perth from January 1920 to December 1961, a period of 42 years. She began her career at the college as a teacher, and in 1931 she took the position of deputy principal, followed by principal in January 1934.

In 1928 she received a scholarship and completed a doctoral degree in French at the University of Paris. In 1962 Summers was appointed an officer of the Order of the British Empire.

Summers published two autobiographical books, The light of other days (1977) and Personalities and places (1978).

References

Australian Officers of the Order of the British Empire
1899 births
Year of death missing
University of Western Australia alumni
University of Paris alumni